Nuestra Belleza Michoacán 2010,  was held in Malecón Río Balsas, Lázaro Cárdenas, Michoacán, Mexico on June 25, 2010. At the conclusion of the final night of competition, Karla Paulina Gutiérrez of Morelia and Victoria Sánchez Elizalde Romo of Pátzcuaro were crowned the winners. Gutiérrez and Sánchez  were crowned by outgoing Nuestra Belleza Michoacán titleholder, Itzel García. Ten contestants competed for the state title.

Results

Placements

Judges
Arturo Jiménez Cardona - Fashion Designer
Gabriela Carbajal - National Coordinator of Nuestra Belleza México
Carlo Antonio Rico - Producer of Televisa
Alma Angélica de la Madrid

Background music
Fey

Contestants

References

External links
Official Website

Nuestra Belleza México